The William Steele House is a property in Franklin, Tennessee, United States, that was listed on the National Register of Historic Places in 1988. It dates from c.1850. It includes Central passage plan and other architecture. The NRHP eligibility of the property was covered in a 1988 study of Williamson County historical resources.

William Alexander Steele

William Alexander Steele was born in 1827 and was the son of William Steele who had settled in the Bethesda area in the early 1800s.  Steele married his cousin Mary Elizabeth Steele in 1850 and constructed the main section of this house circa 1855.  During the Civil War Steele
served in the Fourth Tennessee Cavalry and was nearly caught by Union soldiers while visiting his home.  Upon Steele's death in 1874 the house remained in the possession of his widow who lived until 1911.

References

Central-passage houses in Tennessee
Greek Revival houses in Tennessee
Houses completed in 1850
Houses in Franklin, Tennessee
Houses on the National Register of Historic Places in Tennessee
National Register of Historic Places in Williamson County, Tennessee